Secuestro is an action film about three rookie kidnappers who scramble as their ill-fated plan falls apart. About the terrible wages of violence and crime.

Filmed in four days on location in the mountainous central region of the Dominican Republic as the NYU film school masters thesis of Dominican-American filmmaker Juan Castillo.

Awards
NYU Graduate Film Program awards: Screenwriting, Production, Ensemble Cast, Cinematography, Editing, Directing – the only foreign language NYU graduate thesis film to garner all key category awards.
Showtime Network Latino Filmmakers Showcase.
NYU Spike Lee Fellowship.
Global Foundation for Democracy and Development (FUNGLODE) Maria Montez short film first prize presented by Dominican president Leonel Fernández.

Cast
Leidy Luna, Segunda
Elvis Nolasco, Jefe
Tony Pascual, Novato
Robert Santana, Victim

Other
Genre: Action-Suspense-Thriller

Duration: 30 minutes

Color: color

Format: 35mm

Locations: Dominican Republic

External links
 Internet Movie Database

2005 films
Films shot in the Dominican Republic